Arkadiusz Jędrych (born 27 May 1992) is a Polish professional footballer who plays as a centre-back for GKS Katowice.

Career
On 29 January 2019, Jędrych joined GKS Katowice until June 2021.

References

Polish footballers
Ekstraklasa players
1992 births
Living people
Znicz Pruszków players
MKP Pogoń Siedlce players
Zagłębie Sosnowiec players
GKS Katowice players
I liga players
II liga players
Association football defenders